Frederick Howard Bryant (July 25, 1877 – September 4, 1945) was a United States district judge of the United States District Court for the Northern District of New York.

Education and career

Born in Lincoln, Vermont, Bryant received an Artium Baccalaureus degree from Middlebury College in 1900. He read law in 1903 and went into private practice of law in Malone, New York until 1927.

Federal judicial service

Bryant received a recess appointment from President Calvin Coolidge on May 19, 1927, to the United States District Court for the Northern District of New York, to a new seat authorized by 44 Stat. 1374. He was nominated to the same position by President Coolidge on December 6, 1927. He was confirmed by the United States Senate on December 19, 1927, and received his commission the same day. His service terminated on September 4, 1945, due to his death in Malone.

References

Sources
 

1877 births
1945 deaths
Judges of the United States District Court for the Northern District of New York
United States district court judges appointed by Calvin Coolidge
20th-century American judges
United States federal judges admitted to the practice of law by reading law